The Tenterfield Terrier is a dog breed developed in Australia. They are a strong, active, hardy and agile dog, their smooth short coat making them 'easy care' family companions.

Appearance 
Tenterfield Terriers come in a variety of colours, but their coat colors are mostly white with black, olive or even tan markings in its tones. They are small dogs, on average growing to heights of between 25 and 30 centimeters tall.

History 
The origin of the Tenterfield Terrier is not known. It is said that the Tenterfield Terrier breed originated from dogs that accompanied Australia's first European settlers who sailed from Portsmouth in the south of England. These dogs were pest and vermin killers, with the smallest of them selected to play that role on the European ships, thus leading to their arrival in Australia. It is also said that the smallest puppies from the litters of Fox Terriers were sometimes domestically selected such as for manouvreability in a hunting role, and even  at times crossed with other small breeds to achieve a smaller size.

By the late 19th century a dog type known as the Miniature Fox Terrier (known colloquially as "Mini Foxies") was well established in rural Australia as a vermin killer and family companion. By the 1920s the dog had become a fixture in urban households.

The name "Tenterfield" is sometimes incorrectly stated to denote the breed's place of origin. Rather, it may have derived from a well known breeder. The dog was bred extensively in and around northern New South Wales. Tenterfield is one of many localities in Australia in which small terriers of this type were kept. The town of Tenterfield is significant in Australian history for the Tenterfield Oration on independence from Britain. Additionally, the owner of the town's saddlery a man named George Woolnough, was immortalized by his grandson entertainer Peter Allen as the "Tenterfield Saddler".  Tenterfield residents attest that Mr. Woolnough  owned and loved a number of these terriers, however, photographs of these dogs have not yet been discovered. 

The name Tenterfield Terrier was suggested in the 1990s by television gardening personality Don Burke, and was adopted during the renaming of one of the then-Miniature Fox Terrier clubs.

Health and temperament 
Tenterfield Terriers are fairly healthy breeds of dog, however they are prone to hypothyroidism and patellar luxation, as well as a tendency to become overweight if fed too often. They are a very intelligent and trainable breed of dog, yet will require consistent training. The Tenterfield Terrier is a high-energy dog that will need to be taken for walks at least daily. Their temperament is friendly if well-taken care of,  yet they can become destructive or noisy if bored. Being a terrier, they should not be trusted with non-canine pets such as mice, guinea-pigs, rats, or rabbits.

See also
 Dogs portal
 List of dog breeds
Miniature Fox Terrier
Fox Terrier (Smooth)

References

Terriers
Dog breeds originating in Australia